Tanja sail (Malay: layar tanjak) or tanja rig is a type of sail commonly used by the Austronesian people, particularly in Maritime Southeast Asia. It is also known as the tilted square sail, canted rectangular sail, rectangular balance lug, or balance lug sail in English. In historical sources, tanja sail is sometimes incorrectly referred to as lateen sail or simply square sail.

Etymology

Also called tanjaq, tanjak, tanja', tanjong, or tanjung sail. The Mandar people call it sombal tanjaq because when the wind blows the lower part of the sail (peloang) would "mattanjaq" (lit. "kick"). In colonial British records, it is sometimes written as "lyre tanjong", a misspelling of layar tanjong (layar means "sail" in Malay; layag in Philippine languages).

Origin

There are several different theories regarding the origin of tanja sail.

The sail might be a derivative of the older Austronesian triangular crab-claw sail. It developed from the fixed mast version of the crab-claw sail and is functionally identical, with the only difference being that the upper and bottom spars of the tanja sail do not converge into a point in the leading edge.

Early contact with Arab ships in the Indian Ocean during Austronesian voyages is believed to have resulted in the development of the triangular Arabic lateen sail. Mahdi (1999) believed that in turn, Arab ships may have influenced the development of the Austronesian rectangular tanja sail. Research by Lynn White concludes that the Arab and Indian lateen sail may have been an adaptation of the lateen sail from the Portuguese ships (caravel), which arrived post-1498. According to H. Warington Smyth, the Malay tanja sail is an adaptation and development of the primitive square sail, with boom at the head and the foot. The Malay tilted the sail forward, to bring the tack right to the deck, turning the sail into the most powerful of lifting sails on a wind.

Characteristics

Tanja sail can be distinguished by its canted/oblique design. The sail face is asymmetrical in shape and most of the area is elongated to the sides, rather than upward like those of lug sail.

The 3rd century book "Strange Things of the South" (南州異物志) by Wan Chen (萬震) describes large ships which originates from K'un-lun (Southern country, either Java or Sumatra). The ships called K'un-lun po (or K'un-lun bo). He explains the ship's sail design as follows:

The four sails do not face directly forward, but are set obliquely, and so arranged that they can all be fixed in the same direction, to receive the wind and to spill it. Those sails which are behind the most windward one receiving the pressure of the wind, throw it from one to the other, so that they all profit from its force. If it is violent, (the sailors) diminish or augment the surface of the sails according to the conditions. This oblique rig, which permits the sails to receive from one another the breath of the wind, obviates the anxiety attendant upon having high masts. Thus these ships sail without avoiding strong winds and dashing waves, by the aid of which they can make great speed.— Wan Chen, Nánzhōu Yìwùzhì (Strange Things of the South)

Usage 
Most Southeast Asian and Austronesian vessels used the tanja sail. This type of sail may have brought Austronesian sailors as far as West Africa sometime in the 1st millennium CE, with its feasibility proved by an expedition carried out by a replica ship using such sail in 2003, and there is probability these sailors reached the New World as early as 1420 CE. Some examples of vessels that use tanja sails include:

 Balangay
 Benawa
 Borobudur ship
 Djong
 Garay
 Kakap
 Karakoa
 Kelulus
 Kora-kora
 K'un-lun po
 Lancaran
 Lanong
 Mayang
 Padewakang
 Pajala
 Pangajava
 Patorani
 Pencalang
 Perahu

See also 

 Crab claw sail
 Lug sail
 Junk rig
 Lateen rig
List of Indonesian inventions and discoveries

References 

Sailing rigs and rigging
Indonesian inventions
Austronesian culture